Microhyla karunaratnei is a species of frog in the family Microhylidae. It is endemic to southern Sri Lanka. It is also known as the Karunaratne's narrow-mouth frog or Karunaratne's narrow-mouthed frog. The specific name karunaratnei honours G. Punchi Banda Karunaratne, a Sri Lankan naturalist.

Description
The snout is blunt. The canthus rostralis is rounded. The tympanum is hidden. The fingers have poorly developed discs and no webbing. The toes have webbing, lateral fringes, and more developed discs. Skin is smooth. The dorsum is pinkish grey-brown, and there is a blackish lateral stripe. There is a dark brown mid-dorsal marking, but this is indistinct in some specimens. The venter is white with black marbling.

Habitat and conservation
The tadpoles develop in  wetlands, including old abandoned gem mining pits, the creation of which may actually have benefited the species. However, Microhyla karunaratnei is an uncommon species that is known only from two sites. It is threatened by habitat loss caused by expanding cardamom plantations and by agricultural pollution. It occurs in the Sinharaja Forest Reserve.

References

karunaratnei
Frogs of Sri Lanka
Endemic fauna of Sri Lanka
Amphibians described in 1996
Taxonomy articles created by Polbot